Chrysophyllum is a group of trees in the Sapotaceae described as a genus by Linnaeus in 1753.

The genus is native to tropical regions throughout the world, with the greatest number of species in northern South America. One species, C. oliviforme, extends north to southern Florida.

Description
Chrysophyllum members are usually tropical trees, often growing rapidly to 10–20 m or more in height. The leaves are oval, 3–15 cm long, green above, densely golden pubescent below, from which the genus is named.  The flowers are small (3–8 mm), purplish white and have a sweet fragrant smell; they are clustered several together, and are hermaphroditic (self fertile). The fruit is edible; round, usually purple skinned (sometimes greenish-white), often green around the calyx, with a star pattern in the pulp; the flattened seeds are light brown and hard. The fruit skin is chewy like gum, and contrary to some reports, is edible.

Species
Currently accepted species include:

Formerly included
 Donella ambrensis Aubrév. (as C. ambrense (Aubrév.) G.E.Schatz & L.Gaut.)
 Donella analalavensis Aubrév. (as C. analalavense (Aubrév.) G.E.Schatz & L.Gaut.)
 Donella bangweolensis (R.E.Fr. & Pellegr.) Mackinder (as C. bangweolense R.E.Fr. & Pellegr.)
 Donella capuronii (G.E.Schatz & L.Gaut.) Mackinder & L.Gaut. (as C. capuronii G.E.Schatz & L.Gaut.)
Donella delphinensis Aubrév. (as C. delphinense (Aubrév.) G.E.Schatz & L.Gaut.)
Donella fenerivensis Aubrév. (as C. fenerivense (Aubrév.) G.E.Schatz & L.Gaut.)
Donella guereliana (Aubrév.) Mackinder (as C guerelianum (Aubrév.) G.E.Schatz & L.Gaut.)
Donella masoalensis Aubrév. (as C. masoalense (Aubrév.) G.E.Schatz & L.Gaut.)
Donella perrieri Lecomte (as C. perrieri (Lecomte) G.E.Schatz & L.Gaut.)
Donella pruniformis (Engl.) Pierre ex Engl. (as C. pruniforme Engl.)
 Donella viridifolia (J.M.Wood & Franks) Aubrév. & Pellegr. (as C. viridifolium J.M.Wood & Franks)
Donella ubangiensis (De Wild.) Aubrév. (as C. ubangiense (De Wild.) Govaerts)
Englerophytum longepedicellatum (De Wild.) L.Gaut. (as C. longifolium De Wild.)
Englerophytum magalismontanum (Sond.) T.D.Penn. (as C. magalismontanum Sond.)
Englerophytum oblanceolatum (S.Moore) T.D.Penn. (as C. tessmannii Engl. & K.Krause)
Gambeya azaguieana (J.Miège) Aubrév. & Pellegr. (as C. azaguieanum J.Miège)
Gambeya beguei (Aubrév. & Pellegr.) Aubrév. & Pellegr. (as C. beguei (Aubrév. & Pellegr.) Aubrév. & Pellegr.)
Gambeya boiviniana Pierre (as C. boivinianum (Pierre) Baehni)
Gambeya boukokoensis Aubrév. & Pellegr. (as C. boukokoense (Aubrév. & Pellegr.) L.Gaut.)
Gambeya gigantea (A.Chev.) Aubrév. & Pellegr. (as C. giganteum A.Chev.)
Gambeya gorungosana (Engl.) Liben (as C. gorungosanum Engl.)
Gambeya lacourtiana (De Wild.) Aubrév. & Pellegr. (as C. lacourtianum De Wild.)
Gambeya lungi (De Wild.) Aubrév. & Pellegr. (as C. lungi De Wild.)
Gambeya muerensis (Engl.) Liben (as C. muerense Engl.)
Gambeya taiensis (Aubrév. & Pellegr.) Aubrév. & Pellegr. (as C. taiense Aubrév. & Pellegr.)
Jacquinia arborea Vahl (as C. barbasco Loefl.)
Micropholis rugosa (Sw.) Pierre (as C. rugosum Sw.)
Palaquium philippense (Perr.) C.B.Rob. (as C.  philippense Perr.)
Pouteria alnifolia (Baker) Roberty (as C. alnifolium Baker)
Pouteria gardneri (Mart. & Miq.) Baehni (as C. gardneri Mart. & Miq.)
Pouteria macrophylla (Lam.) Eyma (as C. macrophyllum Lam.)
Pouteria reticulata (Engl.) Eyma (as C. reticulatum Engl.)
Pradosia brevipes (Pierre) T.D.Penn. (as C. soboliferum Rizzini)
Pradosia lactescens (Vell.) Radlk. (as C. burahem Riedel)

References

 
Sapotaceae genera
Neotropical realm flora